The 2019 Monte Carlo Rally (also known as the 87e Rallye Automobile Monte-Carlo) was a motor racing event for rally cars that was held over four days between 25 and 28 January 2019. It marked the eighty-seventh running of the Monte Carlo Rally, and was the first round of the 2019 World Rally Championship. It was also the first round of the World Rally Championship-2 and the newly-created WRC-2 Pro class. The 2019 event was based in the town of Gap in the Hautes-Alpes department of France and consists of sixteen special stages.

Reigning World Drivers' and World Co-Drivers Champions Sébastien Ogier and Julien Ingrassia were the defending rally winners. M-Sport Ford WRT, the team they drove for in 2018, were the defending manufacturers' winners. The Škoda Motorsport crew of Jan Kopecký and Pavel Dresler were the defending winners in the World Rally Championship-2 category, but did not enter the rally. In the World Rally Championship-3 category, Italian privateers Enrico Brazzoli and Luca Beltrame were the reigning rally winners, but did not defend their title as the WRC-3 category was discontinued in 2019.

Ogier and Ingrassia successfully defended their titles. Their team, Citroën World Rally Team, were the manufacturers' winners. The victory also marked the 100th world rally success for the French manufacturer. The M-Sport Ford WRT crew of Gus Greensmith and Elliott Edmondson became the first crew to win an event in the WRC-2 Pro category, while Yoann Bonato and Benjamin Boulloud won the wider WRC-2 class, finishing second in the combined WRC-2 category.

Background

Entry list
The following crews are entered into the rally. The event is open to crews competing in the World Rally Championship, World Rally Championship-2 and WRC-2 Pro, the FIA R-GT Cup, and privateer entries not registered to score points in any championship. Eighty-four crews registered to compete, including eleven competing with World Rally Cars and eleven in World Rally Championship-2. Three of these crews were nominated to score points in the WRC-2 Pro class, but one withdrew before the rally and the crew became a regular WRC-2 entrant.

Route
The route will be  shorter than the one used in 2018. The Thoard — Sisteron and Bayons — Bréziers were removed from the itinerary and replaced by a new stage from La Bréole to Selonnet and the revival of the Avançon — Notre-Dame-du-Laus stage, which had not been contested for a decade. The opening day's stages were also revised to be better-centred around the rally base in Gap. The second and third leg of the rally were unchanged from the 2018 event.

Itinerary

All dates and times are CET (UTC+1).

Report

World Rally Cars
Ott Tänak and Martin Järveoja took the early lead during the first two night stages. However, their lead was short-lived as Thierry Neuville and Nicolas Gilsoul moved to the front after the cancellation of the third stage. Sébastien Ogier and Julien Ingrassia then took over the rally as the Belgian crew missed a junction. Eventually, the six-time world champions won the rally for the sixth time in a row. Neuville and Gilsoul were second, 2.2 seconds behind Ogier and Ingrassia, thus making 2019 the closest finish to the Monte Carlo Rally in history. The previous closest finish was the 1979 edition, with Bernard Darniche winning by just 6.6 seconds over Björn Waldegård.

Classification

Special stages

Championship standings

World Rally Championship-2 Pro

Classification

Special stages
Results in bold denote first in the RC2 class, the class which both the WRC-2 Pro and WRC-2 championships run to.

Championship standings

World Rally Championship-2

Classification

Special stages
Results in bold denote first in the RC2 class, the class which both the WRC-2 Pro and WRC-2 championships run to.

Championship standings

Notes

References

External links

  
 2019 Monte Carlo Rally in e-wrc website
 The official website of the World Rally Championship

2019 in French motorsport
2019 in Monégasque sport
2019 World Rally Championship season
January 2019 sports events in France
2019